The Bangor Area School District is a midsized, public school district located in Northampton County, Pennsylvania in the Lehigh Valley region of eastern Pennsylvania. The school district serves a resident population of 21,093.

Students in grades nine through 12 attend Bangor Area High School in Bangor. Students in grades five through eight attend Bangor Area Middle School. The district operates three elementary schools, DeFranco, Five Points, and Washington, for kindergarten through fourth grades. As of the 2020–21 school year, the school district had a total enrollment of 2,755 students between all five of its schools, according to National Center for Education Statistics data.

Schools
Bangor Area High School
Bangor Area Middle School
DeFranco Elementary School
Five Points Elementary School
Washington Elementary School

References

External links
Bangor Area School District official website
Bangor Area School District on Facebook
Bangor Area High School on Twitter

School districts in Northampton County, Pennsylvania